Jason Slowey (born January 27, 1989) is a former American football center. He played college football for the Western Oregon University and was drafted by the San Francisco 49ers in the sixth round of the 2012 NFL Draft. He also played for the Oakland Raiders and British Columbia Lions. He is currently the Co-Defensive Coordinator and Linebackers Coach at Western Oregon University.

High School Career 
Slowey attended North Medford High School in Medford, Oregon where he played offensive tackle. Slowey generated interest from Oregon State University, Boise State University and Portland State University before ultimately signing a National Letter of Intent to attend Western Oregon University.

College career

2008 season 
Slowey attended Western Oregon University, where he played for coach Arne Ferguson's Western Oregon Wolves football team from 2007 to 2011. Following a red shirt year in 2007, Slowey made his first start for the Wolves against Portland State University on August 30, 2008. He appeared in nine games during the 2008 season, helping the Wolves to a 7-4 record and second place finish in the Great Northwest Athletic Conference (GNAC).

2009 season 
Slowey started all 10 games at tackle, and was recognized as second team All-GNAC offensive lineman. The Wolves finished second in the GNAC standings with a 5-5 record.

2010 season 
The 2010 season was highlighted by 6 game win streak, and two defensive shut-outs. The Wolves finished 8-3 after losing to Central Washington University in the GNAC Championship Game on November 13, 2010. Slowey started all 11 games at tackle, and was recognized as first team All-GNAC, and Honorable Mention All-American.

2011 season 
Slowey started all 11 games at tackle, and was recognized as first team All-GNAC, GNAC Offensive Lineman of the Year, and First Team All-American. The Wolves finished second in the GNAC standings with a 6-5 record.

Track and field 
Slowey competed in track & field while in high school, finishing as the state runner-up in discus (48.28) at the 2007 6A OSAA Track & Field Championships. He was also a track & field star at Western Oregon University.

Professional career

Pre draft
Slowey drew little attention heading into the 2012 NFL Draft until Western Oregon's pro day on March 16, 2012. After a solid performance media began to take notice. Sport's Illustrated's Tony Pauline tabbed Slowey as "one of the nastiest blockers in the draft". Although he was a left tackle in college, he was projected to move inside to center in the NFL.

San Francisco 49ers 
Slowey was drafted in the sixth round with the 199th overall pick by the San Francisco 49ers in the 2012 NFL Draft. On August 10, 2012, Slowey made his NFL debut against the Minnesota Vikings. He appeared in two pre season games for the 49ers. On August 27, 2012 Slowey was released by the 49ers.

Oakland Raiders 
On October 23, 2012, Slowey was signed by the Oakland Raiders. On April 8, 2013, Slowey was released by the Raiders.

BC Lions
On April 23, 2014, Slowey signed a contract with the BC Lions of the Canadian Football League. Slowey retired in June 2014 due to an injury.

Portland Thunder
On October 10, 2013, Slowey was assigned to the Portland Thunder of the Arena Football League. On July 18, 2016, Slowey was activated by the Portland Thunder.

Post NFL career
Slowey was last reported serving as the Co-Defensive Coordinator and Linebackers Coach at Western Oregon.

References

External links

 
 
 

1989 births
Living people
Sportspeople from Medford, Oregon
American football centers
Western Oregon Wolves football players
San Francisco 49ers players
Players of American football from Oregon
Portland Thunder players
North Medford High School alumni
Portland Steel players